Jak Scott (born 23 May 1991) is a Scottish former swimmer.

Scott, a freestyle swimmer, was raised in the town of Hawick and would travel to Edinburgh for training. When he was aged 15 his family relocated to Bo'ness so they could be closer to Edinburgh.

As a  relay swimmer, Scott won two silver medals for Scotland at the Commonwealth Games. In Delhi in 2010 he swam the third leg of the final and in Glasgow in 2014 he featured in the heats. He represented Great Britain at the 2011 and 2013 World Championships, reaching the  final of the latter.

Scott swam for the University of Stirling.

Retiring in 2016, Scott had personal best times of 49.87 for the 100m freestyle and 1:48.00 for the 200m freestyle.

References

External links

1991 births
Living people
British male freestyle swimmers
Scottish male freestyle swimmers
Sportspeople from Hawick
Alumni of the University of Stirling
Commonwealth Games silver medallists for Scotland
Commonwealth Games medallists in swimming
Medallists at the 2010 Commonwealth Games
Medallists at the 2014 Commonwealth Games
Swimmers at the 2010 Commonwealth Games
Swimmers at the 2014 Commonwealth Games